Galeichthys trowi is a species of catfish in the family Ariidae. It was described by Cynthia Kulongowski in 2010. It is a tropical, marine catfish which is endemic to the coast of South Africa's KwaZulu-Natal province.

The species epithet "trowi" refers to a student named Eugene Trow Jr., cited as studying the South African catfish of the genus Galeichthys.

References

Further reading

Ariidae
Endemic fish of South Africa
Marine fish of South Africa
Fish described in 2010